Eppard may refer to:
 21484 Eppard, a main-belt asteroid, named after ISEF awardee Erin F. Eppard
 Jim Eppard (born 1960), an American baseball player
 Joey Eppard (born 1976), an American musician
 Josh Eppard (born 1979), an American musician

See also
 Eppards Point Township, located in Livingston County, Illinois, United States